Simpático is an album by the Brian Lynch/Eddie Palmieri Project, released through ArtistShare in 2006. In 2007, the album won the Grammy Award for Best Latin Jazz Album.

Track listing

Track listing adapted from AllMusic.

Personnel

 Brian Lynch – trumpet, arranger, producer, mixing, liner notes
 Eddie Palmieri – piano, liner notes
 Lila Downs – vocals
 Donald Harrison – alto sax
 Yosvany Terry – alto sax
 Phil Woods – alto sax
 Gregory Tardy – tenor sax, clarinet
 Mario Rivera – baritone sax
 Joe Fiedler – trombone
 Conrad Herwig – trombone
 Boris Kozlov – double bass
 Ruben Rodriguez – bass guitar
 Adam Rogers – acoustic guitar
 Edsel Gomez – organ, piano
 Robby Ameen – drums
 Dafnis Prieto – drums
 Giovanni Hidalgo – conga
 Pedro Rodriguez – conga
 Timbales – Marvin Diz
 Tom Dambly – assistant producer, digital editing, liner notes, mixing assistant, photography
 Dave Darlington – engineer, mixing
 Tom Carr – mastering
 Nick Ruechel – liner notes, photography
 Ted Panken – liner notes

References

2006 albums
Brian Lynch (musician) albums
Eddie Palmieri albums
Collaborative albums
Grammy Award for Best Latin Jazz Album